C. sativus  may refer to:
 Cochliobolus sativus, a fungus species and the causal agent of a wide variety of cereal diseases
 Crocus sativus, the saffron, a plant species native to Southwest Asia
 Cucumis sativus, the cucumber, a widely cultivated plant species

See also
 Sativus (disambiguation)